Vladimir Viktorovich Buss (born 17 June 1978) is a former Russian football player.

Buss played in the Russian Premier League with FC Lada Togliatti.

References

External links
 

1978 births
Living people
Russian footballers
Association football forwards
FC Lada-Tolyatti players
Russian Premier League players
Place of birth missing (living people)